Manon Charette (March 14, 1955 in Salaberry-de-Valleyfield, Quebec, Canada – January 1, 2006 in Richmond, British Columbia) was a Canadian handball player who competed in the 1976 Summer Olympics.

She was part of the Canadian handball team, which finished sixth in the 1976 Olympic tournament. She played all five matches and scored three goals.

For many years, Charette worked at St. Paul's Hospital Foundation, as Director of Finance.

Manon died from cancer on January 1, 2006 in Richmond, British Columbia.

References
 https://web.archive.org/web/20070926215718/http://72.232.38.190/EN/athletes/query/details2.php?id=35339 Profile
 https://web.archive.org/web/20090611230647/http://www.rememberingmanon.com/ Memorial site
 Manon Charette at Sports Reference Profile

1955 births
2006 deaths
Canadian female handball players
Handball players at the 1976 Summer Olympics
Olympic handball players of Canada
Sportspeople from Salaberry-de-Valleyfield
Sportspeople from Quebec
French Quebecers